Skyline is a major city in Saint John Parish, Antigua and Barbuda.

Demographics 
Skyline has five enumeration districts.

References 

Saint John Parish, Antigua and Barbuda
Populated places in Antigua and Barbuda